Wu Han may refer to:

Wu Han (Han dynasty) (吳漢; died 44), Eastern Han dynasty general
Wu Han (historian), PRC historian and politician whose writing was an impetus for the Cultural Revolution
Wu Han (pianist), Chinese-American classical pianist
Wu Han (Indiana Jones), fictional character in the Indiana Jones franchise

See also
Wuhan, capital of Hubei Province, China